The Davis Sisters were an American country music duo consisting of two unrelated singers, Skeeter Davis and Betty Jack Davis. One of the original female country groups, they are best known for their 1953 No. 1 country hit "I Forgot More Than You'll Ever Know" and the duo's debut single "Jealous Love" on Fortune Records.

Rise to fame and success
The Davis Sisters were not related; Skeeter Davis was the stage name of Mary Frances Penick. She met Betty Jack Davis at Dixie Heights High School in Edgewood, Kentucky in 1947. They formed a close relationship as friends and musicians.  Also sharing a career in the music business, singing and recording, they decided to perform as The Davis Sisters.

Fortune Records
The duo began appearing regularly on radio shows in nearby Cincinnati, Ohio and Detroit, Michigan. They first started recording in Detroit at Fortune Records in 1952. The pair recorded "Jealous Love," (Fortune 170) a song written by Devora Brown, co-owner of the Fortune label. Two other singles followed in 1953: "Kaw-Liga / Sorrow And Pain" (Fortune 174) and "Heartbreak Ahead / Steel Wool" (Fortune 175).

RCA
In 1953, they landed a recording contract with RCA Records. While recording for RCA, the sessions were backed up by future country star and producer Chet Atkins. That same year, they released their first single, "I Forgot More Than You'll Ever Know". The mournful and heartbreaking song became a No. 1 country hit, as well as a top 20 pop hit. While their vocals invoked the sound of older Appalachian harmony duos such as the Blue Sky Boys and the Delmore Brothers, the Nashville Sound backing made the overall sound more in line with their more polished contemporaries the Louvin Brothers.

Tragedy and reformation
Shortly after the release of "I Forgot More Than You'll Ever Know", the Davis Sisters were in a car accident just outside of Cincinnati, Ohio on August 2, 1953, which killed Betty Jack instantly and seriously injured Skeeter.

Skeeter reformed the group with Betty Jack's older sister, Georgia. The new duo continued to perform and record until 1956, but failed to have another hit. "Georgia was a fine singer, but it just wasn't the same," Skeeter said in the liner notes to 1995's The Essential Skeeter Davis.

Skeeter Davis went on to a successful solo career. Davis continued to perform frequently throughout much of the 1990s and into 2000. In 2001, she became incapacitated by the breast cancer that would claim her life. While Davis remained a member of the Grand Ole Opry until her death, she last appeared on the program in 2002. She died of breast cancer in a Nashville hospice, at the age of 72, on September 19, 2004.

Discography

Compilation albums

Singles

Notes

References

External links
 Davis Sisters article

Country music duos
Musical groups established in 1947
Musical groups disestablished in 1956
People from Grant County, Kentucky
RCA Victor artists
Country music groups from Kentucky
1947 establishments in Kentucky
1956 disestablishments in Kentucky